RKU may refer to:

 Reichskommissariat Ukraine
 Revolutionary Communist Youth (Norway)
 Revolutionary Communist Youth (Sweden)
 Ryutsu Keizai University